"Come and Get These Memories" is an R&B song  by Motown girl group Martha and the Vandellas. Their second single released under Motown's Gordy Records subsidiary, "Memories" became the group's first hit single, reaching number 29 on the Billboard Pop Singles Chart, and number-six on the Billboard R&B Singles Chart.

Background
The song speaks of heartbreak, as the narrator (lead singer Martha Reeves) goes through her things and gives back everything her now ex-boyfriend had given her, including teddy bears, records, and "lingering love".

"Memories" is also notable as the first hit recording written and produced by the songwriting/production team of Holland-Dozier-Holland, who would become the top creative team at Motown by the end of 1965. The single was the first of several hits the Vandellas scored with the team, before Holland-Dozier-Holland began to focus more heavily on hits for The Supremes and the Four Tops. However, Holland–Dozier–Holland would continue to collaborate with the Vandellas until the songwriting team's departure from Motown in 1967.

Personnel
Produced by Brian Holland and Lamont Dozier
Written by Brian Holland, Lamont Dozier and Edward Holland, Jr.
Lead vocals by Martha Reeves
Background vocals by Rosalind Ashford and Annette Beard
Instrumentation by the Funk Brothers:
Benny Benjamin: drums
James Jamerson: double bass
Joe Hunter: piano
Earl Van Dyke: Wurlitzer electronic piano
Robert White: guitar
Eddie Willis: guitar
Andrew "Mike" Terry: baritone saxophone

Chart performance

Other versions
The Supremes recorded their version (featuring Mary Wilson on lead vocals) which was included on their 1966 The Supremes A' Go-Go album.
Fellow Motown singer Kim Weston recorded the song, but it remained unreleased until her Motown Anthology (and the Motown Sings Motown Treaures album) was released in 2005
Bette Midler recorded the song for her 2014 album It's the Girls!.

References

1963 singles
Martha and the Vandellas songs
Songs written by Holland–Dozier–Holland
Gordy Records singles
Song recordings produced by Brian Holland
Song recordings produced by Lamont Dozier
The Supremes songs
1963 songs
Songs about heartache